Dallas Township is one of the sixteen townships of Crawford County, Ohio, United States. As of the 2010 census the population was 485.

Geography
Located in the southwestern corner of the county, it borders the following townships:
Tod Township - north
Bucyrus Township - northeast
Whetstone Township - east
Tully Township, Marion County - southeast corner
Scott Township, Marion County - south
Grand Prairie Township, Marion County - southwest
Antrim Township, Wyandot County - west

No municipalities are located in Dallas Township.

Name and history
Dallas Township was organized in 1845. It was named for George M. Dallas, a U.S. Senator from Pennsylvania.

It is the only Dallas Township statewide.

Government
The township is governed by a three-member board of trustees, who are elected in November of odd-numbered years to a four-year term beginning on the following January 1. Two are elected in the year after the presidential election and one is elected in the year before it. There is also an elected township fiscal officer, who serves a four-year term beginning on April 1 of the year after the election, which is held in November of the year before the presidential election. Vacancies in the fiscal officership or on the board of trustees are filled by the remaining trustees.

References

External links
County website

Townships in Crawford County, Ohio
Townships in Ohio